Cis fuscipes, the minute tree-fungus beetle, is a species of minute tree-fungus beetle in the family Ciidae. It is found in Australia, the Caribbean, North America, Oceania, and Europe.

References

Further reading

 

Ciidae
Articles created by Qbugbot
Beetles described in 1848